Geir Bjørklund (born 20 April 1969 in Mo i Rana, Norway) is a researcher, health science writer, and scientific advisor. He has contributed to studying interactions of nutritional and environmental factors related to human physiology, biochemistry, and pathology, as well as clinical applications to pursue good health and prevent and treat disease.

Research and publishing
Geir Bjørklund was among the first researchers in Norway who evaluated the risk of occupational disease in dentistry due to mercury exposure. In the late 1990s, he had consulting assignments for the Norwegian Board of Health (Statens helsetilsyn). He was co-author of two of their reports on the use of dental filling materials.

In 1995, Bjørklund founded Tenner & Helse, the membership magazine of Forbundet Tenner og Helse (Norwegian Dental Patient Association), and was its editor until the summer of 1999. In the 1990s, he was also a freelance journalist for Sunnhetsbladet, a Norwegian health magazine.

In 2013, he founded and became president of the Council for Nutritional and Environmental Medicine (CONEM), an international non-profit association based in Norway, particularly engaged in research on heavy and essential metals and trace elements, autoimmune disorders, neurodegenerative diseases, and autism spectrum disorder.

Academic journals
Currently, Geir Bjørklund is а deputy chief editor of Metabolic Brain Disease and a section editor of the journals Current Medicinal Chemistry and Current Pharmaceutical Design. Also, he is an editorial board member of Biological Trace Element Research, Cellular and Molecular Life Sciences, Molecules, and Pharmaceuticals. Bjørklund is a member of the World Association of Medical Editors.

References

External links

 Biography on CONEM's website
 Profile on ResearchGate  
 Profile on Google Scholar 

1969 births
Living people
Norwegian medical writers
Norwegian editors
Norwegian journalists
Norwegian magazine editors
Norwegian writers
People from Mo i Rana